Royston Harry "Roy" Swinbourne (25 August 1929 – 27 December 2015) was an English footballer who played as a centre forward in the Football League for Wolverhampton Wanderers. He was capped once by England B.

Playing career
Swinbourne began his career at Wath Wanderers, the Yorkshire-based nursery club of Wolverhampton Wanderers. He moved south to join Wolves in 1944 and signed as a professional the following year.

After proving himself in the reserve ranks, he made his debut on 17 December 1949 in a 1–1 draw with Fulham. He came to the fore during the 1950–51 season, replacing Jesse Pye in the attack, and finished as top goalscorer with 22 goals. Injuries waylaid him the following year, but in the next campaign, forming what was described as "a potent dual spearhead" with Dennis Wilshaw, he was once again the club's leading scorer with 21 goals.

His tally of 24 in the 1953–54 season was a career best and helped Wolves capture their first ever league championship. It was Swinbourne himself who scored twice in the final game, a 2–0 victory over Tottenham Hotspur that confirmed the title. The following season brought another strong return, including two goals in Wolves' famous floodlit victory over Honved of Hungary.

In 1955 he scored for England B in a 1–1 draw against their German counterparts:  His career was halted when he damaged his knee while hurdling over a posse of cameramen on the pitchside at Luton Town's Kenilworth Road ground in November 1955. After trying to return just weeks later, he was forced to undergo surgery on the injury. He was never able to resume his playing career and was forced to announce his retirement in May 1957.

Later life
In later life, Swinbourne lived in Kinver before moving to a nursing home in Kidderminster.
He died on 27 December 2015, aged 86, following a long battle with vascular dementia. He was survived by his wife, Betty, and daughters Jayne and Helen.

References

External links
 Film clip of Wolves v Honved 1954 at British Pathé

1929 births
2015 deaths
People from Conisbrough
Footballers from Doncaster
English footballers
England B international footballers
Association football forwards
Wolverhampton Wanderers F.C. players
English Football League players
Deaths from vascular dementia